Armand Lunel (9 June 1892 – 3 November 1977) was a French writer and the last known speaker of Shuadit (Judeo-Provençal), a now-extinct Occitan language (in its written form based on the modified Hebrew alphabet; the language persists though in its oral form, which is essentially the same as Provençal written with the Latin alphabet).

Biography

Lunel was born in Aix-en-Provence, France, to a family that belonged to a Jewish subculture that had roots in the area for at least five centuries. After coming of age in the region, Lunel taught law and philosophy in Monaco. Lunel wrote extensively about the Jews of Provence.

He was a childhood friend of the composer Darius Milhaud, and wrote the librettos of Milhaud's operas Esther de Carpentras ("Esther of Carpentras," 1938, based on Shuadit folklore),  Les malheurs d'Orphée ("The Misfortunes of Orpheus," 1924), and David (1954). He also provided the libretto for Henri Sauguet's La chartreuse de Parme, premiered in 1939.

He married Rachel Suzanne Messiah, a daughter of architect Aron Messiah in 1920.

Most of the current knowledge about Lunel was collected by his son-in-law Georges Jessula.

Bibliography
L'Imagerie du cordier, La Nouvelle Revue Française, Paris, 1924.
Nicolo-Peccavi ou L'affaire Dreyfus à Carpentras, Gallimard, Paris, 1926.
Le Balai de sorcière, Gallimard, Paris, 1935.
Jérusalem à Carpentras, Gallimard, 1937.
Les Amandes d'Aix, Gallimard, Paris, 1949.
La Belle à la fontaine, A. Fayard, Paris, 1959.
J'ai vu vivre la Provence, A. Fayard, Paris, 1962.
Juifs du Languedoc, de la Provence et des États français du Pape, Albin Michel, Paris, 1975. Translated by Samuel N. Rosenberg as "The Jews of the South of France" (with a foreword by David A. Jessula), Cincinnati: Hebrew University College Annual 89 (2018), pp. 1–158.
Les Chemins de mon judaïsme et divers inédits, presented by Georges Jessula, L'Harmattan, Paris, 1993.

References

External links
Armand Lunel at Beit Hatefutsot, the Museum of the Jewish Diaspora in Ramat Aviv, Israel
"The Last Man Who Spoke Provence's Dead Jewish Language"

1977 deaths
1892 births
19th-century French Jews
French opera librettists
Last known speakers of a language
Jewish novelists
Prix Renaudot winners
Writers from Aix-en-Provence
French male novelists
French male dramatists and playwrights
20th-century French novelists
20th-century French dramatists and playwrights
20th-century French male writers